Queer Cargo is a 1938 British drama film directed by Harold D. Schuster and starring John Lodge, Judy Kelly and Kenneth Kent. It was made at Elstree Studios. It was based on a play of the same title by Noel Langley.

Cast
 John Lodge as Capt. Harley  
 Judy Kelly as Ann Warren  
 Kenneth Kent as Vibart  
 Bertha Belmore as Henrietta Travers  
 Louis Borel as Benson  
 Wylie Watson as Rev. James Travers 
 Geoffrey Toone as Lt. Stocken  
 Jerry Verno as Slops  
 Frank Pettingell as Dan  
 Frank Cochran as Ho Tang

Citations

General bibliography 
 Chibnall, Steve & McFarlane, Brian. The British 'B' Film. Palgrave MacMillan, 2009.
 Wood, Linda. British Films, 1927–1939. British Film Institute, 1986.

External links

1938 films
British drama films
1938 drama films
1930s English-language films
Films shot at Associated British Studios
Films directed by Harold D. Schuster
British black-and-white films
Films with screenplays by Noel Langley
Films with screenplays by Patrick Kirwan
1930s British films